SNOLAB is a Canadian underground science laboratory specializing in neutrino and dark matter physics. Located 2 km below the surface in Vale's Creighton nickel mine near Sudbury, Ontario, SNOLAB is an expansion of the existing facilities constructed for the original Sudbury Neutrino Observatory (SNO) solar neutrino experiment. 

SNOLAB is the world's deepest operational clean room facility. Although accessed through an active mine, the laboratory proper is maintained as a class-2000 cleanroom, with very low levels of dust and background radiation. SNOLAB's 2070 m (6800 feet) of overburden rock provides 6010 metre water equivalent (MWE) shielding from cosmic rays, providing a low-background environment for experiments requiring high sensitivities and extremely low counting  The combination of great depth and cleanliness that SNOLAB affords allows extremely rare interactions and weak processes to be studied. In addition to neutrino and dark matter physics, SNOLAB is also host to biological experiments in an underground environment.

History 
The Sudbury Neutrino Observatory was the world's deepest underground experiment since the Kolar Gold Fields experiments ended with the closing of that mine in 1992.  With the deepest underground laboratory in North America at 2100 metre water equivalent depth, and the deepest in the world at 4800 MWE, many other groups were interested in conducting experiments in the 6000 MWE location.

In 2002, funding was approved by the Canada Foundation for Innovation to expand the SNO facilities into a general-purpose laboratory, and more funding was received in 2007 and 2008.

Construction of the major laboratory space was completed in 2009, with the entire lab entering operation as a 'clean' space in March 2011.

SNOLAB is the world's deepest underground laboratory, tied with the China Jinping Underground Laboratory since 2011. Although CJPL has more rock (2.4 km) above it, the effective depth for science purposes is determined by the cosmic ray muon flux, and CJPL's mountain location admits more muons from the side than SNOLAB's flat overburden. (For comparison, the rate on the surface, at sea level, is about 15 million μ/m²/day.)

CJPL does have the advantage of fewer radioisotopes in the surrounding rock.

Experiments 
, SNOLAB hosts the following experiments:

Neutrino detectors

 SNO+  is a neutrino experiment using the original SNO experiment chamber, but using liquid scintillator in the place of heavy water from SNO. Linear alkyl benzene, the scintillator, increases the light yield, and therefore the sensitivity, allowing SNO+ to detect not only solar neutrinos, but also geoneutrinos, and reactor neutrinos. The ultimate goal of SNO+ is to observe neutrinoless double beta decay (0vbb).
 HALO (Helium and Lead Observatory) is a neutron detector using ring-shaped lead blocks to detect neutrinos from supernovae within our galaxy. HALO is part of the Supernova Early Warning System (SNEWS), an international collaboration of neutrino-sensitive detectors that will allow astronomers the opportunity to observe the first photons visible following a core-collapse supernova.

Dark matter detectors

 DAMIC - Dark Matter in Charged Coupled Devices (CCDs) – a dark matter detector using unusually thick CCDs to take long exposure images of particles passing through the detector. Various particles have known signatures and DAMIC seeks to find something new that could signal dark matter particles.
 DEAP-3600 - Dark Matter Experiment using Argon Pulse-shape Discrimination -  is a second generation dark matter detector, using 3600 kg of liquid argon. This experiment aims to detect WIMP-like dark matter particles through argon scintillation, or small amounts of light detected by extremely sensitive photomultiplier tubes.
 The PICO 40L, a third generation bubble chamber dark matter search experiment, is a merger of the former PICASSO and COUPP collaborations. PICO operates using superheated fluids which form small bubbles when energy is deposited by particle interactions. These bubbles are then detected by high speed cameras and extremely sensitive microphones.

Biological experiments

 FLAME – Flies in A Mine Experiment – a biological experiment using fruit flies as a model organism to investigate the physical responses to working in increased atmospheric pressure underground.
 REPAIR – Researching the Effects of the Presence and Absence of Ionizing Radiation – a biological experiment investigating the effects of low background radiation on growth, development, and cellular repair mechanisms.

Projects under construction

 SuperCDMS - Super-Cryogenic Dark Matter Search - is a second generation dark matter detector using silicon and germanium crystals cooled down to 10 mK, a fraction of a degree above absolute zero. This experiment aims to detect low mass dark matter particles through very small energy deposition in the crystal from particle collisions, resulting in vibrations detected by sensors.
NEWS-G - New Experiments with Spheres–Gas – is a second generation spherical proportional counter electrostatic dark matter detector using noble gases in their gaseous state, as opposed to liquid noble gases used in DEAP-3600 and miniCLEAN. The original NEWS experiment is at the Laboratoire Souterrain de Modane.

Decommissioned experiments

 The original heavy water based Sudbury Neutrino Observatory experiment,
 The POLARIS underground project at SNOLAB (PUPS), observing seismic signals at depth in very hard rock,
 The first-generation COUPP 4-kg bubble chamber dark matter search, is no longer in operation.
 The DEAP-1 dark matter search, and
 The PICASSO dark matter search.
 MiniCLEAN (Cryogenic Low-Energy Astrophysics with Noble gases) dark matter detector,

Future projects

Additional planned experiments have requested laboratory space such as the next-generation nEXO, and the COBRA Experiment searches for neutrinoless double beta decay. There are also plans for a larger PICO-500L detector.

The total size of the SNOLAB underground facilities, including utility spaces and personnel spaces, is:

References

External links
 SNOLAB website
 SNOLAB french presentations
 
 

 

Underground laboratories
Experiments for dark matter search
Neutrino observatories
Laboratories in Canada
Scientific organizations based in Canada
2011 establishments in Ontario
Research institutes established in 2011